Andrew McBride (born December 9, 1982) is a Canadian professional box lacrosse player for the Calgary Roughnecks in the National Lacrosse League (NLL) and Coquitlam Adanacs of the Western Lacrosse Association (WLA). He was the fourth overall selection by the Roughnecks at the 2002 NLL Draft, and has played for Calgary since the 2003 season, and has won two Champion's Cup titles with the team in 2004 and 2009. Additionally, he won the Presidents Cup, Canada's senior B championship, in 2004. McBride also competed in the 2015 World Indoor Lacrosse Championships for the Irish National Team.

Statistics

NLL

References

1982 births
Living people
Calgary Roughnecks players
Canadian lacrosse players
People from Delta, British Columbia
Sportspeople from British Columbia